Paul David Serna (born November 16, 1958) is an American former professional baseball player. He played two seasons in Major League Baseball (MLB) for the Seattle Mariners.

Career
Playing mostly shortstop down the stretch, Serna batted .255 with 4 home runs in 30 games. That earned him a shot the following year, and he spent the whole  season in Seattle as a utility infielder. In 68 games that season, he batted .225, with just 3 home runs and 8 RBI.

The following season, Serna was returned to the minor leagues. He played for three more seasons, but never played in the majors again.

Sources

1958 births
Living people
American expatriate baseball players in Canada
American expatriate baseball players in Mexico
Azusa Pacific Cougars baseball players
Baseball players from California
Bellingham Mariners players
Calgary Cannons players
Chattanooga Lookouts players
Lynn Sailors players
Major League Baseball second basemen
Major League Baseball shortstops
Major League Baseball third basemen
People from El Centro, California
Seattle Mariners players
Tecolotes de Nuevo Laredo players